Chruściele may refer to the following places:
Chruściele, Ciechanów County in Masovian Voivodeship (east-central Poland)
Chruściele, Wołomin County in Masovian Voivodeship (east-central Poland)
Chruściele, Warmian-Masurian Voivodeship (north Poland)